Erick Alberto Corrales Barrantes (born November 1, 1984 ) is a Costa Rican striker who plays for Municipal Grecia.

Club career
In 2009 Corrales moved abroad for a stint at Salvadoran side Nejapa. In August 2013, La China returned to Barrio Mexico.

References

1984 births
Living people
Association football forwards
Costa Rican footballers
Deportivo Saprissa players
C.S. Cartaginés players
Nejapa footballers
Belén F.C. players
Costa Rican expatriate footballers
Expatriate footballers in El Salvador
Liga FPD players
Municipal Grecia players